
The Pont del Diable, also known as Sant Bartomeu Bridge, is a medieval bridge crossing the river Llobregat and straddling the municipalities of Martorell and Castellbisbal in Catalonia, Spain. The bridge is restricted to pedestrians.

The present bridge, featuring a large pointed arch, is a 1965 reconstruction of the gothic bridge built in 1283 on Roman foundations. The bridge was destroyed in 1939 during the Spanish civil war by retreating Republican troops, but rebuilt in 1965 in a form generally similar to the gothic structure. It is now surrounded on three sides by road flyovers and railway lines.

The original Roman bridge formed a part of the Via Augusta, and was the only bridge in the lower Llobregat valley until the 14th century. It still features a Roman triumphal arch at its eastern abutment. It is unclear how many spans the original Roman bridge had.

See also
 List of Roman bridges

References

Sources

 

Buildings and structures completed in 1283
Deck arch bridges
Stone bridges in Spain
Roman bridges in Catalonia
Pedestrian bridges in Spain
Bridges completed in the 13th century